Jelka Reichman (born 29 August 1939) is a Slovene painter and illustrator, best known for her children's books illustrations.

Reichman was born in Ljubljana in 1939. She graduated from the Academy of Fine Arts in Ljubljana in 1963. She has illustrated over 200 children's books and is the designer of over 20 stamps issued by the Slovenian Post Office.

In 2005 she won the Levstik Award for lifetime achievement in illustration. She was named Slovene Woman of the Year for 2011.

References

Artists from Ljubljana
Slovenian illustrators
Living people
1939 births
Levstik Award laureates
University of Ljubljana alumni
Slovenian women artists
Slovenian women illustrators
Slovenian children's book illustrators